During Post-invasion Iraq, Operation Iron Saber was a coalition strike aimed at defeating the Mahdi army under the control of Muqtada al-Sadr in Najaf, Al Kut and Karbala.  The major United States unit involved was Task Force 1/37 Bandits
Launched in April 2004, and after intense urban warfare which involved Mahdi militiamen taking refuge in mosques, coalition forces had defeated the Mahdi army by June and had forced a cease-fire with al-Sadr.

External links
Global Security

Military operations of the Iraq War involving the United States
Military operations of the Iraq War involving Iraq
Military operations of the Iraq War in 2004